Serrano River is a river located in the Magallanes Region of Chile. Its main tributary is Grey River. The Serrano Glacier is an attraction on the river. The waters of the Serrano River eventually reach Seno Ultima Esperanza.

The Chilean scientific agency CEQUA confirmed an infestation of the algae Didymo in the Serrano River in early 2015.

Area prehistory
Several significant elements of prehistory have been found in the region. Notably not far from the southern area of the river's mouth is situated the Cueva del Milodon, a cave where evidence of prehistoric man's habitation has been found, illustrating arrival of humans approximately 6,000 BC.

See also
 Salto Grande
 List of rivers of Chile

References
 Cuenca del río Serrano. 2004
 C. Michael Hogan, Cueva del Milodon, The Megalithic Portal, ed. A. Burnham, 13 April, 2008

Line notes

Serrano
Rivers of Magallanes Region